Metoidioplasty, metaoidioplasty, or metaidoioplasty (informally called a meto or meta) is a female-to-male sex reassignment surgery.

In a metoidioplasty, the urethral plate and urethra are completely dissected from the clitoral corporeal bodies, then divided at the distal end, and the testosterone-enlarged clitoris straightened out and elongated. A longitudinal vascularized island flap is configured and harvested from the dorsal skin of the clitoris, reversed to the ventral side, tubularized and an anastomosis is formed with the native urethra. The new urethral meatus is placed along the neophallus to the distal end and the skin of the neophallus and scrotum reconstructed using labia minora and majora flaps.

The term derives from meta- "change", Ancient Greek , and -plasty, denoting surgical construction or modification.

Operation

Alternative techniques
Recent studies have introduced an operative technique known as extensive metoidioplasty. This method extensively detaches the clitoris, nearly completely detaching it from the pubic arch before its reattachment and elongation. Current studies show this method yielding penile lengths of 6–12 centimeters, with 7/10 patients being capable of obtaining erections capable of penetrative intercourse.

Complications
Complications from metoidioplasty vary in severity. Minor complications may be resolved through minor supportive care, while more serious complications may require surgical correction. As with other surgical procedures, metoidioplasty has the possibility to cause infection, bleeding, blood clots, damage to surrounding tissues, pain, as well as negative reactions to anesthesia or other required medications.

If urethral lengthening is performed, urethral complications such as urinary fistula may occur. Patients who experience postvoid incontinence or dribbling following surgery report their symptoms as resolved within three months.

Satisfaction rates among patients who undergo metoidioplasty are generally very high regarding both appearance and sexual satisfaction.

Comparison with phalloplasty
Metoidioplasty is technically simpler than phalloplasty, more affordable, and has fewer potential complications. However, phalloplasty patients are far more likely to be capable of sexual penetration (mainly due to size constraints) after they recover from surgery.

In a phalloplasty, a plastic surgeon fabricates a neopenis by autografting tissue from a donor site (such as from the patient's back, arm or leg). A phalloplasty takes about 8–10 hours to complete (the first stage), and is generally followed by multiple (up to three) additional surgical procedures including glansplasty, scrotoplasty, testicular prosthesis, and/or penile implantation.

Metoidioplasty typically requires 2–3 hours to complete. Because the clitoris' erectile tissue functions normally, a prosthesis is unnecessary for erection (although the clitoris might not become as rigid as a penile erection). In nearly all cases, metoidioplasty patients can continue to have clitoral orgasms after surgery.

Note also, that the two alternative techniques are not mutually exclusive and phalloplasty extension of a metioidiplasic base neophallus is possible.

History
The first metoidioplasty was reported in 1973 and the term was coined in a 1989 paper.

See also 

 List of transgender-related topics

References

Further reading

External links 
 Metoidioplasty.net - The Metoidioplasty Surgery Guide
 FemaletoMale.org | Information about Metoidioplasty

Gender-affirming surgery (female-to-male)
1973 in health
1973 in science